The It's My Life Tour was a concert tour headlined by Anglo-American hard rock band Tin Machine. The tour commenced on 5 October 1991 after two warm-up shows, one press show and three trade-industry shows, visiting twelve countries and concluding after seven months and sixty-nine performances, a larger outing than their first tour in 1989.

Tour details
The band rehearsed and warmed up for the tour in Dublin in August 1991. Joined onstage by guitarist Eric Schermerhorn, Tin Machine presented songs from the Tin Machine album and the Tin Machine II album, augmented with cover versions of songs from the Pixies, Neil Young and The Moody Blues.

To start the show at some venues, an old TV was placed on stage, playing old sitcoms while the prelude to Wagner's Tristan and Isolde played over loudspeakers.

The band purposefully booked intimate venues of a few thousand seats or less so that they could focus on the music without any theatrical trappings, a stark change from Bowie's previous Glass Spider and Sound+Vision tours; Bowie also wanted to avoid playing larger venues and arenas lest his fans show up "hoping I'd be doing old songs or something. We don't want that feeling at all."

Bowie claimed that the setlist for the tour was made on the fly each night, saying "We have no setlist whatsoever. We have a complete list of all our songs on the floor of the stage and we yell it out as we feel it. If you catch us on a bad night, it can be one of the most disastrous shows you've ever seen. But on a good night – and fortunately with this band most nights have been good nights – it really happens.

Live recordings
Their performance on 1 September 1991 at the Los Angeles airport was taped for broadcast in America as part of the ABC In Concert series, and was aired on 6 September 1991.

Tin Machine were the musical guest on Saturday Night Lives 17th season on 23 November 1991.

The Hamburg Docks performance on 24 October 1991, was filmed and later released on the video, Oy Vey, Baby: Tin Machine Live at the Docks, with the song "Baby Can Dance" from the same performance appearing on the compilation album Best of Grunge Rock. 

Songs from the Boston, Chicago, New York City, Sapporo and Tokyo performances were recorded and released on the live album Tin Machine Live: Oy Vey, Baby (1992).

Contemporary reviews
The review of the performance at the trade show at Slim's in San Francisco was not kind: "It's hard to imagine people walking out on a David Bowie show at Slim's, but all you had to do was look around the room Thursday at the end of the appearance by Tin Machine. ... Bowie and his associates gave a more than hour-long display of his latest incarnation, and the music turned out to be nearly unlistenable."

The show in Seattle, Washington was met with positive reviews: "Let it first be said that on every level, Tin Machine is an outstanding band. ... [they] may well represent the next evolutionary step in rock and roll – or just another blind alley. In any event, it is powerful stuff." During the show Bowie played alto and baritone sax and electric, acoustic and 12-string guitar.

The Los Angeles Times had a positive review of the first New York show, complimenting the band on their desire to tinker with songs' arrangements and appreciating Bowie's "theatrical gift" for performing.

Tour band
David Bowie – vocals, guitar, alto & tenor saxophone
Reeves Gabrels – lead guitar, vocals
Tony Sales – bass guitar, vocals
Hunt Sales – drums, vocals
Eric Schermerhorn – rhythm guitar, vocals

Tour dates

Songs
Notation:
 CD Included on the Oy Vey, Baby album
 VHS/LD Included on the Oy Vey, Baby video album
 CD/VHS/LD Included on both versions of the Oy Vey, Baby album

From Live Santa Monica '72 "My Death" (originally from La Valse à Mille Temps (1959) by Jacques Brel; written by Brel & Mort Shuman)
 "I'm Waiting for the Man" (originally from The Velvet Underground & Nico (1967) by The Velvet Underground and Nico, written by Lou Reed; outtake from various Bowie sessions 1966–72)
From Tin Machine "Heaven's in Here" CD/VHS/LD
 "Tin Machine" (Bowie, Reeves Gabrels, Hunt Sales, Tony Sales)
 "Crack City" VHS/LD
 "I Can't Read" (Bowie, Gabrels) CD/VHS/LD
 "Under the God" CD/VHS/LD
 "Amazing" (Bowie, Gabrels) CD
 "Bus Stop" (Country version) (Bowie, Gabrels) VHS/LD
 "Pretty Thing"
 "Sacrifice Yourself" (Bowie, H. Sales, T. Sales) VHS/LD
 "Baby Can Dance"
From Tin Machine II "Baby Universal" (Bowie, Gabrels) VHS/LD
 "One Shot" (Bowie, Gabrels) VHS/LD
 "You Belong in Rock 'n' Roll" (Bowie, Gabrels) CD/VHS/LD
 "If There Is Something" (originally from Roxy Music (1972) by Roxy Music; written by Bryan Ferry) CD/VHS/LD
 "Amlapura" (Bowie, Gabrels) VHS/LD
 "Betty Wrong" (Bowie, Gabrels) VHS/LD
 "You Can't Talk" (Bowie, Gabrels) VHS/LD
 "Stateside" (Bowie, H. Sales) CD/VHS/LD
 "Shopping for Girls" (Bowie, Gabrels)
 "A Big Hurt"
 "Sorry" (H. Sales)
 "Goodbye Mr. Ed" (Bowie, H. Sales, T. Sales) CD/VHS/LD

From Black Tie White Noise''' "I Feel Free" (originally from Fresh Cream (1966) by Cream; written by Pete Brown & Jack Bruce)

Other songs:
 "A Hard Rain's A-Gonna Fall" (from The Freewheelin' Bob Dylan (1963) by Bob Dylan; written by Dylan)
 "April in Paris" (from the Broadway musical Walk A Little Faster (1932); written by Vernon Duke and E. Y. Harburg)
 "Baby, Please Don't Go" (a single (1935) by Big Joe Williams)
 "Debaser" (from Doolittle (1989) by the Pixies; written by Black Francis)
 "Don't Start Me Talkin'" (a single (1955) by Sonny Boy Williamson II)
 "Dream On Little Dreamer" (from The Scene Changes (1965) by Perry Como; written by Jan Crutchfield and Fred Burch)
 "Fever" (a single (1956) by Little Willie John; written by Eddie Cooley and John Davenport (a.k.a. Otis Blackwell))
 "Go Now" (a single in 1964 by Bessie Banks and later made famous by The Moody Blues the following year; written by Larry Banks and Milton Bennett) VHS/LD
 "I'm a King Bee" (a single (1957) by Slim Harpo; written by Harpo)
 "In Every Dream Home a Heartache" (from For Your Pleasure (1973) by Roxy Music; written by Ferry)
 "I've Been Waiting for You" (originally from Neil Young (1968) by Neil Young; written by Young), later included on Bowie's 2002 album, Heathen (David Bowie album).
 "Shakin' All Over" (originally a single (1960) by Johnny Kidd and the Pirates; written by Johnny Kidd; B-side to "You Belong in Rock n' Roll")
 "Somewhere" (from the musical West Side Story (1957); written by Leonard Bernstein and Stephen Sondheim)
 "Throwaway" (from Primitive Cool (1987) by Mick Jagger of The Rolling Stones, written by Jagger)
 "Wild Thing" (by The Wild Ones (1965) and made famous by The Troggs; written by Chip Taylor)
 "(You Caught Me) Smilin'" (from There's a Riot Goin' On (1971) by Sly & the Family Stone; written by Sylvester Stewart)
 "You Must Have Been a Beautiful Baby" (from the Hard to Get soundtrack (1938) by Dick Powell; written by Harry Warren and Johnny Mercer)

References

 Nicholas Pegg, The Complete David Bowie, Reynolds & Hearn Ltd, 2004, 
 David Buckley, Strange Fascination: The Definitive Biography of David Bowie'', Virgin Books, 1999, 

1991 concert tours
1992 concert tours
David Bowie concert tours